"Love You Anyway" is a song by American country music singer Luke Combs. It released on February 10, 2023, as the lead single from his upcoming fourth studio album Gettin' Old.

Content
In 2022, Combs wanted to write a song about his wife, Nicole, whom he married in 2020. He presented the idea during a writing session with his friend Dan Fulcher, who suggested the title "Love You Anyway" to him. Combs described the song as "very poetic". Jeremy Chua of Taste of Country thought the song had elements of the neotraditional country movement of the late 1980s and early 1990s, highlighting Combs' voice and the use of fiddle in particular.

Charts

References

2023 singles
2023 songs
Columbia Records singles
Luke Combs songs
Songs written by Luke Combs